The 2022–23 Western Kentucky Hilltoppers men's basketball team represented Western Kentucky University during the 2022–23 NCAA Division I men's basketball season. The Hilltoppers were led by head coach Rick Stansbury in his seventh season and played their home games at E. A. Diddle Arena in Bowling Green, Kentucky as ninth-year members of Conference USA.

Previous season
The Hilltoppers finished the 2021–22 season 19–13, 11–7 in C-USA play to finish tied for second the West Division. They quarterfinals of the C-USA tournament to Louisiana Tech.

Offseason

Departures

Incoming transfers

Recruiting classes

2022 recruiting class
There were no incoming recruits for the class of 2022.

2023 recruiting class

Roster

Schedule 

|-
!colspan=12 style=| Exhibition

|-
!colspan=12 style=| Non-conference Regular season

|-
!colspan=12 style=| Conference USA regular season

|-
!colspan=12 style=| Conference USA Tournament

Source

References

Western Kentucky
Western Kentucky Hilltoppers basketball seasons
Western Kentucky Basketball, Men's
Western Kentucky Basketball, Men's